Acacia pennivenia is a species of legume in the family Fabaceae.
It is endemic to Socotra.
Its natural habitat is subtropical or tropical dry forests.

Sources

pennivenia
Endemic flora of Socotra
Near threatened plants
Taxonomy articles created by Polbot
Taxobox binomials not recognized by IUCN